Lopatinsky District is an administrative and municipal district (raion), one of the twenty-seven in Penza Oblast, Russia. It is located in the southeast of the oblast. Its administrative center is the rural locality (a selo) of Lopatino. Population: 14,942 (2010 Census);  The population of Lopatino accounts for 29.4% of the district's total population.

References

Notes

Sources

Districts of Penza Oblast